Petrades is the easternmost point of mainland Greece.  It is located south of the community of Pythio.  The community was affected by the floods of Evros which lasted from February 17 to March 8, 2005.  Turkey is to the south and to the east.  Forests are along the riverbed and farmlands are along Petrades.  It is accessed by a road linking GR-51 near Didymoteicho and Pythio and Uzunköprü and south to Keşan.

Nearest places

Pythio, north
Prangio, west

See also

Communities of Evros

Didymoteicho
Populated places in Evros (regional unit)